The Pakistan Billiard & Snooker Federation is the national governing body to develop and promote the sports of Billiards and snooker in the Pakistan. The Federation was formed in 1958.

The Federation is affiliated with the Pakistan Sports Board. and it is a member of the International Billiards and Snooker Federation.

References

External links
 Official Website

 

Sports governing bodies in Pakistan
Snooker in Pakistan
Snooker governing bodies
Sports organizations established in 1958
1958 establishments in Pakistan